Košická Nová Ves is a borough (city ward) of Košice, Slovakia.

History 
The first written record of Košická Nová Ves is from 1297. In that year, St Ladislaus' Church was built there. St Ladislaus Church has kept the same patron saint to this day.

Košická Nová Ves was originally a separate village municipality until 1968, when it was annexed to the city. Since 1990, it has been one of the 22 boroughs of Košice. The borough still retains a rural character. There are no industrial zones and most of the housing is rural in nature.

Nowadays, the borough of Košická Nová Ves covers an area of 5.77 km2, with a population of 2,691.

Evolution of the borough's name 
 1297 - Cassa Uj Falu
 1317 - Nova Villa
 1773 - Kassa-Új-Falu, Kossiczka Nowa Wes
 1808 - Kassa-Újfalu, Neudorf, Nowá Wes
 1863 - Kassaújfalu
 1920 - Košická Nová Ves

Location 
Latitude: 48° 43' 
Longitude: 21° 18' 
Altitude: 261 m (859 feet)

Statistics

 Area: 
 Population: 2,691 (31 December 2017) 
 Density of population: 470/km2 (31 December 2017) 
 District: Košice III
 Mayor: Michal Krcho (as of 2018 elections)

Gallery

References

External links

Official website of the Košická Nová Ves borough
Article on the Košická Nová Ves borough at Cassovia.sk 
Official website of Košice

Boroughs of Košice
Villages in Slovakia merged with towns